KRUP is a commercial radio station programming talk in Dillingham, Alaska, broadcasting on 99.1 FM.

External links

Country radio stations in the United States
RUP
Talk radio stations in the United States
Radio stations established in 1990
1990 establishments in Alaska